The AJ Bell 2013 Men's World Open Squash Championship is the men's edition of the 2013 World Championship, which serves as the individual world championship for squash players. The event took place in Manchester in England from 26 October to 3 November 2013. Nick Matthew won his third World Championship title, defeating Grégory Gaultier in the final.

Prize money and ranking points
For 2013, the prize purse was $325,000. The prize money and points breakdown is as follows:

Seeds

Draw and results

Finals

Top half

Section 1

Section 2

Bottom half

Section 1

Section 2

See also
World Championship
2013 Women's World Open Squash Championship
2013 Men's World Team Squash Championships

References

External links
World Squash Championship 2013 website
PSA World Championship 2013 website

World Squash Championships
M
Men's World Open Squash
2010s in Manchester
Squash in England
International sports competitions in Manchester
Men's World Open Squash
Men's World Open Squash